DnaB may refer to:
 DNA helicase, an enzyme class
 dnaB helicase, a bacterial enzyme